The anterior ligament of the lateral malleolus (anterior tibiofibular ligament or anterior inferior ligament) is a flat, trapezoidal band of fibers, broader below than above, which extends obliquely downward and lateralward between the adjacent margins of the tibia and fibula, on the front aspect of the syndesmosis.

It is in relation, in front, with the fibularis tertius, the aponeurosis of the leg, and the integument; behind, with the interosseous ligament; and lies in contact with the cartilage covering the talus.

References

External links
  - "Anterior inferior tibiofibular ligament"

Additional images

Ligaments of the lower limb